Unto Nevalainen (born 13 June 1935) is a Finnish footballer. He played in 21 matches for the Finland national football team from 1957 to 1961. He was chosen Finnish Footballer of the Year in 1959. He played for TPS, HIFK and Reipas in Mestaruussarja. He also played ice hockey.

References

External links
 

1935 births
Living people
Finnish footballers
Finland international footballers
Place of birth missing (living people)
Association footballers not categorized by position